Detectorists is a British comedy television series first broadcast on BBC Four in October 2014. It is written and directed by Mackenzie Crook, who also stars alongside Toby Jones.

The series is set in the fictional small town of Danebury in north Essex. The plot revolves around the lives, loves and metal-detecting ambitions of Andy and Lance, members of the Danebury Metal Detecting Club. The main filming location for the series and Christmas specials is Framlingham, a small market town in Suffolk.

Detectorists won a BAFTA at the 2015 British Academy Television Awards for Television Scripted Comedy. In May 2019, it was voted 19th in a Radio Times list of Britain's 20 favourite sitcoms by a panel that included sitcom writers and actors. It is filmed in single-camera setup.

The show ran for three series from 2014 to 2017, including a 2015 Christmas special. A further Christmas special aired in 2022.

Cast
 Mackenzie Crook as Andy Stone, an agency worker who qualifies as an archaeologist during the series. A member of the Danebury Metal Detecting Club (DMDC)
 Toby Jones as Lance Stater, a forklift truck driver for a vegetable wholesaler, and amateur musician. A member of the DMDC
 Lucy Benjamin as Maggie, Lance's ex-wife who runs a New Age supplies shop (series 1, 3)
 Adam Riches as Tony, Maggie's boyfriend, a pizza restaurant manager (series 1)
 Rachael Stirling as Becky, Andy's girlfriend (wife as of series 2), a primary school teacher
 Gerard Horan as Terry Seymour, a retired policeman who is the president of the DMDC
 Sophie Thompson as Sheila Seymour, Terry's wife
 Pearce Quigley as Russell, a DMDC member
 Divian Ladwa as Hugh, a shy and awkward DMDC member
 Orion Ben as Varde, a mostly silent DMDC member and girlfriend of Louise. Despite appearing in nearly every episode, and being described by members of the DMDC as very talkative, her only lines of dialogue are in series 2, episode 4, and the 2022 Christmas special.
 Laura Checkley as Louise, a forthright DMDC member and girlfriend of Varde
 Aimee-Ffion Edwards as Sophie, an ancient history student at a university (series 1, 2)
 David Sterne as Larry Bishop, an eccentric farmer and landowner (series 1, 2)
 Simon Farnaby as Philip Peters and Paul Casar as Paul Lee, members of "AntiquiSearchers", later "Dirt Sharks", "Terra Firma", and then "Absolut Hunters", a rival metal detecting group. Lance and Andy call them Simon and Garfunkel due to their resemblance to the pop duo Paul Simon and Art Garfunkel. Peters calls his partner "Paul" in series 1, episode 3, and both give their full names when questioned by the police in series 2, episode 5 (echoing the rather different vocal pairing of Peters and Lee) 
 Diana Rigg as Veronica, Becky's mother and occasional child-minder for Stanley (series 2, 3). Rigg, who died in 2020, and Stirling were mother and daughter in real life. In the 2022 Christmas special Veronica is stated to have died prior to the events depicted in it.
 Alexa Davies as Kate, daughter of Lance (series 2, 3)
 Rebecca Callard as Toni, a mechanic and colleague of Lance, who becomes his girlfriend (2015 Christmas special, series 3, 2022 Christmas special)
 Daniel Donskoy as Peter, a German visitor who seeks the DMDC's help in finding the location of his grandfather's aircraft, alleged to have crashed during World War II. He becomes a love interest for Sophie (series 2)
 Jacob and Isabella Hill as Stanley, Becky and Andy's baby (series 2)
 Asa James Wallace as Stanley, Becky and Andy's child (series 3, 2022 Christmas special)

Episodes

Series 1 (2014)

Series 2 (2015)
Series 2 commences with a three-minute sequence showing an Anglo-Saxon priest carrying a holy book and an aestel (a pointer stick similar to that associated with the Alfred Jewel) in a sack and fleeing mounted spearmen. He buries the sack near a standing stone. Time lapse shows all but the decorated gold handle of the stick decaying, and the shot pans upwards to reveal Andy and Lance walking across the field in present-day Danebury, detecting as they go. Having had no success, they decide to look up the hill. The jewel is shown again, still buried, at the beginning of subsequent episodes.

Christmas Special (2015)

Series 3 (2017)
In March 2017, the BBC released a statement confirming the filming of a third and final series. The six-episode third series was filmed in the summer of 2017 and aired weekly on BBC Four from 8 November 2017.

The first episode ends with a historical timeline sequence, backed by the song "Magpie" by The Unthanks. Reviewing the opening episode for The Guardian, Sam Wollaston said: "Mackenzie Crook and Toby Jones shine in the third and final series of this beautifully written and performed slice of life."

Christmas Special (2022)
A 75-minute Christmas special was announced in May 2022. The episode aired on BBC Two on 26 December 2022.

Production
Detectorists was announced by the BBC on 31 January 2014. The producer was Adam Tandy and the series was a Channel X and Lola Entertainment co-production.

Although the series is set in Essex, it was mainly filmed in neighbouring Suffolk, with Framlingham used as a major location. Other locations used in filming include Orford, where Orford Primary School was used as the outside of Becky's school, Great Glemham, where interior pub scenes were filmed, and Ipswich. In series 2, the round-tower church at Aldham was used as a recurring location. 
One location in Essex was used in Detectorists: the scenes involving Lance's girlfriend Toni's houseboat, 'Elsie', were filmed at Paper Mill Lock, Little Baddow. Locations were sourced by Creative England.

Upon deciding to finish the show at the end of series 3, Crook commented "it took a while to realise that I did want to do six more episodes to finish. I don't want to make any sort of big, dramatic announcement that 'never again', but I can't see myself going back to it."

Despite ruling out further episodes at the end of series 3, in December 2020 Crook alluded to the possibility that a fourth series was not out of the question, saying "I'm just starting the process of thinking 'yeah, we should get the old band back together'."

When asked about the possibility of Detectorists returning for a fourth series after the 2022 Christmas special, Crook responded "I’m going to give the same answer I gave at the end of the third series; "probably not". I guess, dot dot dot, I mean, where can you go after this?".

Broadcast
Internationally, the series premiered in Australia on 9 November 2015 on BBC First. In the United States, the series premiered on streaming subscription service Acorn TV in August 2015.

Reception

Critical response
Series one of Detectorists was met with positive reviews from a number of UK and US media outlets. David Renshaw, writing for The Guardian, had particular praise for the "delightful double-act" Mackenzie Crook and Toby Jones. Renshaw points to the "biggest ratings BBC4 has ever had for a comedy" as evidence that "Detectorists has clearly struck the sort of gold that Lance and Andy spend hours sweeping the fields for". Rupert Hawksley, writing for The Daily Telegraph, was particularly impressed with Crook's "first-rate writing" and remarked in his review that series one "has all the markings of a classic sitcom".

Ellen E. Jones of The Independent said that while the show "requires some patience... it has turned out to be one of the best new sitcoms of the year".

In the US media, The New York Times writer Mike Hale describes Detectorists as a "distinctive creation – not for everyone, but bound to be fiercely loved by those who fall into its rhythms". Robert Lloyd of the Los Angeles Times "can't recommend it enough", saying: "Like the ordinary lives it magnifies, Detectorists has the air of seeming to be small and immense at once, to be about hardly anything and almost everything. It is full of space and packed with life."

When the programme returned for a second series, the response was again positive.

On the completion of the third and final series, Radio Times website reviewer Mark Braxton wrote "The series finale... is one of the most satisfying conclusions ever. Series one and two both ended in clever and memorable ways: bittersweet and punch-the-air respectively. But the series three finale has a real poetry to it; Crook seems to be saying: "Yes, that's where we'll leave it – I'm happy with that."

The series has also received praise for its authentic portrayal of "a gentler side to maleness and male bonding", with Ben Dowell of The Times  describing the show as being "steeped in a gentle kindness that I hadn't seen before".

A book of academic essays about the series, Landscapes of Detectorists, was published by Uniformbooks in 2020.

Awards and nominations

References

Further reading
 
 Wahlbrinck, Bernd. Detecting Allusions in Mackenzie Crook’s Detectorists – An Illustrated Guide. Tumbleweed, 2023. ISBN 978-3982146386

External links

Detectorists scripts at BBC writers room
Detectorists Filming Locations Map

2014 British television series debuts
2010s British comedy television series
2020s British comedy television series
BAFTA winners (television series)
BBC television comedy
English-language television shows
Metal detecting
Television duos
Television shows set in Essex